Zearalanol may refer to:

 α-Zearalanol (zeranol)
 β-Zearalanol (taleranol)

See also
 Zearalenol
 Zearalanone
 Zearalenone